AST is one of the largest book publishing companies in Russia, headed by Oleg Bartenev (Олег Бартенев). It owns a bookstores chain "Bukva" (lit. A Letter).

Among AST partners are publishing companies Astrel, Zebra E, Molodaya Gvardiya, CenterCom, bookstores Moscow and Biblio Globus and online shops, such as Ozon.ru. It also owns comic book and manga publisher Comics Factory.

History 
The company was established in 1990 by Andrey Gertsev, Sergei Derevianko and Tatiana Derevianko as "Creative Cooperative Association AST". AST is an abbreviation meaning Andrey-Sergei-Tatiana.  In 1993 the company was divided into AST itself, headed by Andrey Gertsev, and AST-PRESS.

As of 2007, AST and its rival (later parent company) Eksmo together published approximately 30% of all Russian books.  In 2008 AST purchased Avanta+.

On April 19, 2012 the commercial subdivision of AST "Pyaty okean" filed for bankruptcy, as their debts exceeded 7,5 billion roubles. Eksmo stated that they had plans for AST purchase. In June 2012 , the general director of Eksmo, reported that Eksmo gained control on several subdivisions of AST, with an exception of "Bukva" bookstores chain.

References

External links

Book publishing companies of Russia
Publishing companies established in 1990
Russian speculative fiction publishers